James Henry Bloor (29 September 1857 – 9 March 1935) was an English cricketer.  Bloor was a right-handed batsman who bowled right-arm medium pace. He was born at Clifton, Bristol.

Bloor made his first-class debut for Gloucestershire against Kent in 1887 at Rectory Field, Blackheath. He made two further first-class appearances for the county in 1887, against Sussex at the County Ground, Hove, and Middlesex at Lord's. In his three matches, he scored a total of 44 runs at an average of 8.80, with a high score of 22.

He died at Brynmawr, Brecknockshire, on 9 March 1935.

References

External links
James Bloor at ESPNcricinfo
James Bloor at CricketArchive

1857 births
1935 deaths
Cricketers from Bristol
English cricketers
Gloucestershire cricketers